Ontario is the largest city in Malheur County, Oregon, United States. It lies along the Snake River at the Idaho border. The population was 11,366 at the 2010 census. The city is the largest community in the region of far eastern Oregon, also known as the Western Treasure Valley.

Ontario is the principal city of the Ontario, OR-ID Micropolitan Statistical Area, which includes Malheur County in Oregon and Payette County in Idaho.

Ontario is approximately halfway between Portland and Salt Lake City. It is the closest city to the Idaho border along Interstate 84. The city's slogan is "Where Oregon Begins".

History

Ontario was founded on 11 June 1883, by developers William Morfitt, Mary Richardson, Daniel Smith, and James Virtue. In March 1884, Richard Welch started a post office for the quarter of Ontario, so named by James Virtue after Ontario, Canada. Two months later Joseph Morton applied for a Morton post office at an island about one mile south of town, with Oscar Scott as postmaster. Unfortunately for Morton and Scott, merchants Morfitt and Richardson of Malheur City, gold miner Virtue, and lumberman Smith of Baker City acquired more land and were better financed. More importantly, Morfitt had negotiated a train depot for Ontario. All the settlers and speculators knew the railroad was coming and how important that would be to Ontario's future so Scott closed his Morton post office and built a hotel at present-day Ontario. By December, Scott was Ontario's postmaster.

The town continued to grow with the arrival of the Oregon Short Line Railroad in later 1884, and freight and passenger service were added to the town's offerings. Soon after, stock began arriving from Eastern Oregon's cattle ranches to Ontario's stockyard for transshipment to markets throughout the Pacific Northwest. Ontario became one of the largest stockyards in the West. In addition, the construction of the Nevada Ditch and other canals aided the burgeoning agricultural industry, adding those products to Ontario's exports.

Ontario was incorporated by the Oregon Legislative Assembly on 11 February 1899.

A city by the time of World War II, Ontario Mayor Elmo Smith allowed Japanese Americans to settle at a time when much of the West Coast supported their exclusion. Smith told the Associated Press "If the Japs, both alien and nationals, are a menace to the Pacific Coast safety unless they are moved inland, it appears downright cowardly to take any other stand than to put out the call, 'Send them along; we'll cooperate to the fullest possible extent in taking care of them.'" A population of about 134 in the city and surrounding county before the war ballooned to 1,000 as the county recruited farm workers during the war.

Geography

Climate

Ontario has a cold desert dry-summer continental climate, abbreviated "BSk" on climate maps. As is common with the high deserts of Oregon, winters are cold and snowy, while summers are hot, dry and sunny.

Demographics

2020 census
Note: the US Census treats Hispanic/Latino as an ethnic category. This table excludes Latinos from the racial categories and assigns them to a separate category. Hispanics/Latinos can be of any race.

As of the 2020 United States census, there were 11,645 people, 4,315 households, and 2,491 families residing in the city.

2010 census
As of the census of 2010, there were 11,366 people, 4,275 households, and 2,678 families living in the city. The racial makeup of the city was 69.5% White, 0.7% African American, 1.3% Native American, 2.2% Asian, 0.1% Pacific Islander, 22.6% from other races, and 3.5% from two or more races. Hispanic or Latino of any race were 41.3% of the population.

There were 4,275 households, of which 35.4% had children under age 18 living with them, 41.3% were married couples living together, 16.0% had a female householder with no husband present, 5.3% had a male householder with no wife present, and 37.4% were non-families. 30.9% of all households were made up of individuals, and 15.3% had someone living alone who was 65 years of age or older. The average household size was 2.60 and the average family size was 3.28 .

The median age in the city was 32.1 years. 28.9% of residents were under age 18; 12.3% were between the ages of 18 and 24; 23% were from 25 to 44; 21% were from 45 to 64; and 14.9% were 65 years of age or older. The gender makeup of the city was 47.3% male and 52.7% female.

2000 census
As of the census of 2000, there were 10,985 people, 4,084 households, and 2,634 families living in the city. The population density was 2,459.3 people per square mile (948.8/km). There were 4,436 housing units at an average density of 993.1 per square mile (383.2/km). The racial makeup of the city was 69.27% White, 0.55% African American, 2.69% Asian, 0.88% Native American, 0.15% Pacific Islander, 23.09% from other races, and 3.39% from two or more races. Hispanic or Latino of any race were 32.05% of the population.

There were 4,084 households, out of which 35.6% had children under the age of 18 living with them, 47.4% were married couples living together, 13.1% had a female householder with no husband present, and 35.5% were non-families. 30.4% of all households were made up of individuals, and 15.4% had someone living alone who was 65 years of age or older. The average household size was 2.63 and the average family size was 3.30 .

In the city, the population was spread out, with 30.5% under age 18, 11.5% from 18 to 24, 24.0% from 25 to 44, 18.6% from 45 to 64, and 15.4% who were 65 years of age or older. The median age was 31 years. For every 100 females, there were 89.7 males. For every 100 females age 18 and over, there were 85.2 males.

The median income for a household in the city was $29,173, and the median income for a family was $35,625. Males had a median income of $29,775 versus $21,967 for females. The per capita income for the city was $14,683. About 16.4% of families and 20.8% of the population were below the poverty line, including 29.0% of those under age 18 and 14.3% of those age 65 or over.

Economy

Tater tots were first created and manufactured here in 1953 (commercial distribution began in 1956).

St. Alphonsus Medical Center is a 49-bed, acute-care hospital, serving Ontario and the surrounding communities in Eastern Oregon and southwestern Idaho; it is part of the hospital system of Saint Alphonsus Regional Medical Center in Boise, Idaho.

Opened in 1991 and expanded in 1998, the prison has approximately 900 employees.

Cannabis legalization
Since 2019, cannabis dispensaries have been an important part of Ontario's economy and a notable example of the border effect.

In November 2018, voters overturned a ban on recreational marijuana dispensaries in the town, several years after Oregon legalized recreational marijuana use. As Ontario borders Idaho (where marijuana remains illegal for all purposes), local news outlets reported that by November 2019 the city's dispensaries were generating a significant amount of revenue from Idaho residents driving across the state line. Total cannabis sales from Ontario dispensaries topped $100 million in December 2020. The additional revenue from cannabis sales reversed a years-long trend of cutting the annual city budget.

Education

Tertiary education
Treasure Valley Community College

K-12 education
Ontario is served by the Ontario School District (8C) public schools. Schools include:

 Ontario High School 9-12
 Ontario Middle School 7-8
 Aiken Elementary K-5
 Alameda Elementary K-6
 Cairo Elementary K-5
 May Roberts Elementary K-6
 Pioneer Elementary K-5

There is also a charter school:
Four Rivers Community School (4RCC) - K-12 - It began operations in 2003.

The Annex School has an Ontario postal address but is away from Ontario, in the community of Annex.

Private schools
Treasure Valley Christian School Pre K-12
St. Peter's Catholic School (Roman Catholic Diocese of Baker) K-8

Ontario Community Library of the Ontario Library District is in Ontario.

Media
Ontario's daily paper is the Argus Observer.

Transportation
Bus
 Snake River Transit provides public transportation between points in Ontario and nearby Fruitland and Payette.
 Ontario is a stop on the Eastern POINT intercity bus line between Bend and Ontario. It makes one stop per day in each direction.
 Greyhound Lines offers service east and west on I-84 from Ontario.
Air
 Ontario Municipal Airport
Highway
  Interstate 84 - Portland - Boise - Ogden

Notable people
Cliff Bentz, congressman (2nd district) and former state senator (District 30)    
Jorge Cervantes, horticulturist, writer, and expert in medical cannabis
Madeline DeFrees, poet
Tom Edens, MLB pitcher
A. J. Feeley, NFL quarterback
Erik Fisher, World Cup alpine ski racer 
Sally Flynn, also known as Sally Hart, singer on The Lawrence Welk Show
Charles C. Gossett, governor of Idaho and U.S. Senator
Joel Hardin, Border Patrol agent and mantracker
Denny Jones, congressman and rancher
Randall B. Kester, Oregon judge
Phyllis McGinley, children's author
Elmo Smith, newspaper editor, mayor of Ontario and governor of Oregon
Leland Evan Thomas, WWII pilot killed in action at Guadalcanal
Dave Wilcox, NFL linebacker

Sister cities
Ontario has one sister city, as designated by Sister Cities International:

  Ōsakasayama, Osaka, Japan

See also
 Oregon Short Line Railroad Depot

References

External links

 
 
 
 

 
Cities in Oregon
Populated places established in 1883
Ontario, Oregon micropolitan area
Basque-American culture in Oregon
1883 establishments in Oregon
Cities in Malheur County, Oregon